Lesroy Charlesworth Weekes (born 19 July 1971. Lesroy was born in Montserrat, Lesser Antilles, West Indies) is a former first-class cricketer.

Weekes was a fast bowler who made appearances for the Leeward Islands, Lincolnshire, Northamptonshire for 3 years, Yorkshire for 2 years and the Yorkshire Cricket Board, taking one hundred sixty nine first-class wickets at an average of 27.11, and scoring 535 runs at 17.83, in a fitful career which spanned the 1990s. He also played in twenty eight List A one day games, taking 27 wickets at 40.14.

Since retiring from first-class cricket, Weekes became one of the more successful league cricketers in the North of England. In one season for the Yorkshire League Club, Rotherham Town C.C., he amassed over 90 wickets and scored 500 runs. Weekes also played for Elsecar C.C. and currently plays at Wath C.C.

Other than continuing to play cricket, Weekes has become the Head of Cricket at Mount St. Marys College.

References

External links
 Cricinfo Profile

Northamptonshire cricketers
Yorkshire cricketers
1971 births
Living people
Leeward Islands cricketers
Yorkshire Cricket Board cricketers
Lincolnshire cricketers
Montserratian cricketers